Josef Václavík (4 May 1900 – 20 January 1973) was a Czech architect. His work was part of the architecture event in the art competition at the 1936 Summer Olympics.

References

1900 births
1973 deaths
20th-century Czech architects
Olympic competitors in art competitions
People from Tábor